Charlotte Barker (born 1962) is a British actress.

Career
Barker was born in 1962 in Willesden, London, England, Barker is the only daughter of Ronnie Barker and Joy Tubb. As an actress she worked mostly in theatre. Her television debut came in the film Frankie and Johnnie (1985). The same year she appeared in episodes of the television sitcoms Open All Hours (with her father) and Fresh Fields, then in 1987 she was in the film Wish You Were Here and also in Agatha Christie's Miss Marple: At Bertram's Hotel. Other parts came in The Widowmaker (1990) and the crime series Maigret (1992) with Michael Gambon.

In 1998, she appeared in the play Mum, which was written by her father.

Family
Her elder brother, Larry, retired after a successful career in advertising. Her younger brother, Adam, was an actor (Wycliffe).

References

External links
 

1962 births
Living people
20th-century English actresses
21st-century English actresses
Actresses from London
English film actresses
English television actresses
People from Willesden
Date of birth missing (living people)